R v Wang (2005) in the criminal law of England and Wales is the binding precedent, from the highest court, that a judge in England or in Wales is not entitled to direct, or instruct, order or require, a jury to return a verdict of guilty.

Background
Mr Cheong Wang was a Chinese political asylum-seeker and a Buddhist, of the Shaolin Sect. On the 27 February 2002 he was waiting for a train at Clacton-on-Sea railway station when his bag was stolen. He searched and found a thief with the bag, whom he attempted to "detain", and from whom he recovered it. From this, he drew a curved martial-arts sword, with a sheath. In the ensuring altercation, or disturbance, the local police was called in, and upon a further search of the bag by the Police a small Ghurkha-style kukri knife was found. For all these, he was indicted on two counts, of having an article with a blade or point in a public place, contrary to Section 139(1) of the Criminal Justice Act 1988.

Wang was tried in the Crown Court at Chelmsford, also in Essex, before His Honour Judge Pearson, Circuit Judge, with a jury. Upon the 28 August 2002, Wang was convicted, upon that Circuit Judge's direction of guilt to the Jury, of the two offences, and he was on the 4 October 2002 conditionally discharged, for a period of 12 months. Forfeiture orders were also made for the two offending articles.

Appeal to the Court of Appeal
He appealed against his conviction to the Court of Appeal, and the appeal was heard before Laws LJ, Curtis J and the Recorder of Cardiff. They dismissed the appeal, concluding a judge was entitled to direct the jury to convict provided that 'it is plain beyond sensible argument that the material before the jury could not in law suffice to discharge the burden' necessary to satisfy the defence.

Appeal to the House of Lords
Wang duly appealed to the Judicial Committee of the House of Lords. In a unanimous opinion, the appellate committee allowed his appeal and quashed his conviction, concluding that 'there are no circumstances in which a judge is entitled to direct a jury to return a verdict of guilty' because a 'belief that the jury would probably, and rightly, have convicted does not [enable a trial judge to give a direction to convict] ...  when there were matters which could and should have been the subject of their consideration'.

Significance
The judgment settled the law in England and Wales by providing a clear authority in this topic of uncertainty. The case caused the Criminal Cases Review Commission to refer the 1972 conviction of Edward Caley-Knowles to the Court of Appeal. Caley-Knowles's conviction was subsequently quashed based on the authority of Wang.

References

2005 in case law
W
House of Lords cases
Crime in Essex
2005 in British law
2000s in Essex